Sēlpils Castle is an ancient castle in Sēlpils Parish, Jēkabpils Municipality in the Selonia region of Latvia.

History 
It was built in place of the ancient Sēlpils hillfort, a military and political center of ancient Selonia, a land of the Balts. When the Livonian Order entered the land, they built a stone castle  known as Selburg in German.

Today, the village of Vecsēlpils ("old Sēlpils") is located nearby. The ruins of the hillfort were on the left bank of Daugava near Vecsēlpils. After the construction of Pļaviņas Hydroelectric Power Station and reservoir, the ruins are on an island.

Archeological findings 
Archaeological evidence shows that Sēlpils, 17 km northwest of modern Jēkabpils, was a major settlement between the 10th and 13th centuries. Used as a base for raids by the Selonians and their Lithuanian allies into Latgalian and Livonian lands, Sēlpils was first mentioned in the Chronicle of Henry of Livonia, which describes its capture by the Livonian Order and their Christianized ethnic Livonian allies in 1208. Sēlpils was briefly the seat of a Selonian diocese (1218–1226), and then came under the rule of the Livonian Order, which constructed fortifications there for the Advocate of the Order. These were destroyed by the Swedes in 1704, during the Great Northern War, and only traces of the foundations are visible at the site today.

Since the early 17th century, the ancient city of Sēlpils also existed. The importance of Sēlpils as a trading center on the Daugava declined after the military devastation of the early 18th century.

See also
Battle of Selburg

References

Further reading
Arveds Švābe, ed.: Latvju enciklopēdija. Stockholm: Trīs Zvaigznes, 1952-1953.
Edgars Andersons, ed.: Latvju enciklopēdija 1962-1982. Lincoln: American Latvian Association, 1983-1990. Entry "Sēlija" available at historia.lv. Retrieved 26 February 2006.

Archaeological sites in Latvia
Castles of the Livonian Order
Jēkabpils Municipality
Friedrichstadt County
Selonia